Mist is a 1988 Swedish-German-Turkish drama film directed by Zülfü Livaneli.

Cast 
 Uğur Polat - Erol
 Asli Altan
  
 Rutkay Aziz - Ali Firat
 Kenan Pars

References

External links 

1988 drama films
1988 films
Swedish drama films
Turkish drama films
German drama films
1980s German films
1980s Swedish films